Collin Walcott (April 24, 1945 – November 8, 1984) was an American musician who worked in jazz and world music.

Early life
Walcott was born in New York City, United States. He studied violin and tympani in his youth, and was a percussion student at Indiana University. After graduating in 1966, he went to the University of California, Los Angeles, and studied sitar under Ravi Shankar and tabla under Alla Rakha.

Later life and career
According to critic Scott Yanow of AllMusic, Walcott was "one of the first sitar players to play jazz". Walcott moved to New York and played "a blend of bop and oriental music with Tony Scott" in 1967–69. Around 1970 he joined the Paul Winter Consort and co-founded the band Oregon. These groups, along with the trio Codona, which was founded in 1978, combined "jazz improvisation and instrumentation with elements of a wide range of classical and ethnic music".

Walcott also played on the Miles Davis 1972 album On the Corner, had three releases under his own name on ECM Records, and taught at the Naropa Institute in Boulder, Colorado.
 
Walcott was killed in a bus crash in Magdeburg, East Germany, on November 8, 1984, while on a tour with Oregon.

Author David James Duncan wrote retrospectively in 1996 about an Oregon concert he attended in Cascade Head in his piece "My One Conversation with Collin Walcott". Duncan described Walcott as sitting "buddha-style" on stage, surrounded by instruments. Along with an electronic drum kit "to his north", Walcott "had five different tablas to his south, a sitar to his east and a bewildering semicircle of rattles, chimes, clackers, bells, whistles, finger-drums, triangles and unnameable noisemakers to his west. He was the first Western 'jazz' percussionist I'd ever seen sit flat on the floor like an East Indian."

Discography

As leader
Cloud Dance (1976) ECM 1062 
Grazing Dreams (1977) ECM 1096
Dawn Dance (1981) ECM 1198 (with Steve Eliovson)
Works (compilation) (1988) ECM/Polygram 837 276

With Oregon
Our First Record CD (1970) Universe 42
Music of Another Present Era CD (1973) Vanguard VMD-79326
Winter Light CD (1974) Vanguard VMD 79350
Distant Hills CD (1974) Vanguard VMD-79341
In Concert CD (1975) Universe 25
Together (w/Elvin Jones) CD (1976) Universe 9
Friends CD (1977) Vanguard 79370-2
Out of the Woods CD (1978) Discovery 71004
Violin CD (1978) Universe 40
Moon and Mind CD (1979) Vanguard VMD 79419
Roots in the Sky CD (1979) Discovery 71005
In Performance CD (1980) Wounded Bird Records 304
Oregon (ECM, 1983)
Crossing (ECM, 1984)

With Codona
Codona (recd.1978, pbl.4/1979) ECM 1132
Codona 2 (recd.1980, pbl.2/1981) ECM 1177
Codona 3 (recd.1982, pbl.2/1983) ECM 1243

With The Rainbow Band
 The Rainbow Band (Elektra, 1971)

As sideman
Within his brief career Walcott played with a range of different musicians of different styles and contributed to the following albums: 

With David Amram
 Subway Night (RCA Victor, 1973)
With Bobby Callender
 Rainbow (MGM Records, 1968)
With Don Cherry
 Hear & Now (Atlantic, 1977)
With Larry Coryell
 The Restful Mind (Vanguard, 1975)
With Cosmology
 Cosmology (Elektra, 1971)
With David Darling
 Cycles (ECM, 1981)
With Miles Davis
On the Corner (Columbia, 1972)
With Rachel Faro
 Refugees (RCA Victor, 1974)
With Cyrus Faryar
 Cyrus (Elektra, 1971)
 Islands (Elektra, 1972)
With Egberto Gismonti
 Sol do Meio Dia (ECM, 1978)
With Tim Hardin
 Bird on a Wire (Columbia 1971)
With Richie Havens
 Richard P. Havens, 1983 (Verve, 1969)
With Dave Liebman
 Drum Ode (ECM, 1974)
With Alan Lorber Orchester
 The Lotus Palace (Big Beat Records, 1967)
With Meredith Monk
 Key (Increase/Lovely Music, 1971)
 Our Lady of Late (Minona/WERGO, recd. 1972, publ. 1973)
 Dolmen Music (ECM, 1981)
 Turtle Dreams (ECM, 1983)
With Jim Pepper
 Comin' and Goin' (Rykodisc, 1983)
With Vasant Rai
 Spring Flowers (Universe, 1976)
 Autumn Song (Universe, 1978)
With Alla Rakha
 Tabla Solo (Vanguard, 1977)
With Tony Scott
 Music for Yoga Meditation and Other Joys (Verve, 1968)
 Tony Scott (Verve, 1970)
With Titos Sompa
 Yao! Titos Sompa with the Tanawa Dance Company (Vanguard, 1978) [production only]
With Ralph Towner
 Trios / Solos (ECM, 1973) with Glen Moore
With Barry Wedgle
 Kake (Wonderful World Records, 1982)
With Elyse Weinberg
 Elyse (Orange Twin, 1968)
With Paul Winter
 Road (A&M, 1971)
 Icarus (Epic, 1972)

See also
 Sitar in jazz

References

External links
 Official website

1945 births
1984 deaths
Appalachian dulcimer players
Sitar players
Indiana University alumni
UCLA School of the Arts and Architecture alumni
Pupils of Ravi Shankar
ECM Records artists
Road incident deaths in Germany
Oregon (band) members
Paul Winter Consort members
Codona members